Methodist University is a private university that is affiliated with the North Carolina Annual Conference of the United Methodist Church and located in Fayetteville, North Carolina. It is accredited by the Southern Association of Colleges and Schools Commission on Colleges.

The university offers more than 80 undergraduate and graduate degree programs, including doctoral-level options, on campus and online. It offers 24 fully online degrees and certificate programs. Methodist University also features more than 150 student clubs and organizations, along with 20 NCAA intercollegiate sports. It has graduated more than 12,000 students since its first graduating class in 1964.

Brief History 
Originally known as Methodist College, the state of North Carolina chartered the school on November 1, 1956. On its 50th anniversary, the Board of Trustees voted unanimously to change the name from Methodist College to Methodist University. The University has had five presidents in its history:

 L. Stacy Weaver (1957-1973)
 Dr. Richard Pearce (1973-1983)
 Dr. M. Elton Hendricks (1983-2010)
 Dr. Ben E. Hancock, Jr. (2011-2018)
 Dr. Stanley T. Wearden (2019-Current)

Relationship to the United Methodist Church 
Current President Stanley T. Wearden says, “While Methodist University values its affiliation with The United Methodist Church, the Church does not set the policies of the University.” The University also states it provides access and inclusion to all students regardless of their gender, sexual orientation, origin, ethnicity, or creed.

Academics 
Methodist University’s more than 80 academic programs live under three different colleges: College of Arts, Humanities & Sciences, College of Business, Technology & Professional Studies, and College of Health Sciences & Human Services.

College of Arts, Humanities & Sciences 
The College of Arts, Humanities & Sciences carries six different divisions, each hosting a variety of majors, minors, and certificates:

 Communication, Composition & Rhetoric Division: Applied Communication, Health Communication, Public Affairs Communication, Organizational Communication & Leadership, Leadership Communication, Mass Communication, Journalism, Radio, TV/Multimedia/Video, and Sports Media
 Fine & Performing Arts Division: Art, Painting, Art Education, Graphic Design, Music, Arts Management, Music Composition, Music Education, Music Performance, and Theatre
 Humanities Division: English, Global Studies, History, History with Social Studies Licensure, Spanish, Professional Leadership & Ethics, Religion, Ethics, Global History, Philosophy, Women’s Studies, American Studies, European Studies, and Teaching English as a Second Language
 Justice & Military Science Division: Clandestine Labs, Criminal Justice, Forensic Science (CSI), Digital Forensics, Legal Studies, Military Science, Air Force ROTC, and Army ROTC 
 Natural Sciences Division: Biology, Cell & Molecular Biology, Health Care Biology, Integrative Biology, Chemistry, Biochemistry, Forensic Science, General Science Education (9-12), and Science
 Social Sciences Division: Leadership & Management, Political Science, International Relations, Public Administration, Psychology, Counseling/Clinical Psychology, Human Performance, Sociology, Church Leadership, Cognitive Behavioral Neuropsychology, Leadership Studies, and Public Health

College of Business, Technology & Professional Studies 
The College of Business, Technology & Professional Studies offers five separate divisions that offer a variety of majors, minors, and certificates:

 Reeves School of Business: Accounting, Business Administration, Business Analytics, Entrepreneurship, Financial Economics, Management, Marketing, Sport Management, Health Care Administration, PGA Golf Management, Professional Tennis Management, Resort, Club & Hospitality Management, Economics, Finance, Human Resource Management, International Business, and Master of Business Administration (MBA)
 Computer Science & Computer Information Technology: Business Information Systems, Cybersecurity & Information Assurance, Interactive Multimedia Application Development, Computer Information Technology, and Computer Science
 Engineering & Environmental Studies Division: Engineering concentrating in Industrial Engineering, Environmental & Occupational Management concentrating in Regulatory Compliance, and Environmental & Occupational Management concentrating in Regulatory Compliance & Management of Natural Resources
 Teacher Education Program: Art Education (K-12), Elementary Education (K-6), English Education (9-12), General Science Education (9-12), History with Social Studies Licensure (9-12), Middle Grades Education (6-9), Music Education (K-12), Physical Education & Health Education (K-12), School Social Work, Special Education: General Curriculum (K-12), Academically & Intellectually Gifted (K-12), Teaching English as a Second Language (K-12), Educational Studies, and Education
 Mathematics

College of Health Sciences & Human Services 
Set up a differently than the other two colleges, seven departments (Health Care Administration, Kinesiology, Nursing, Occupational Therapy, Physical Therapy, Physician Assistant, and Social Work) live within the College of Health Sciences & Human Services:

 Undergraduate majors: Exercise & Sport Science, Fitness, Wellness & Coaching, Health Care Administration, Kinesiology, Nursing, RN-to-BSN, Occupational Therapy, Physical Education & Health Education, Social Work, Social Work with licensure in School Work
 Undergraduate minors: Community Health Education, Exercise & Sport Science, Gerontology, Health Care Administration, Health Care Information Management, Psychosocial Aspects of Sport & Coaching, and Social Work
 Undergraduate Certificate Programs: Community Health Education, Health Care Administration, and Psychosocial Aspects of Sport & Coaching
 Graduate degree programs: Doctor of Occupational Therapy, Doctor of Physical Therapy, Master of Health Administration, Master of Medical Science in Physician Assistant Studies, Master of Nursing
 Graduate Certificate Programs: Health Care Administration and Nursing Education

Online Programs 
Methodist University began offering online programs in the 2020-21 school year. Primarily designed to help adult learners, active-duty soldiers and their family members, veterans, and untraditional students, MU offers 24 different programs and certificates:

 Associate degree: General Studies
 Bachelor’s degree: Professional Leadership and Ethics, Accounting, Health Care Administration (Accounting), Business Administration, Health Care Administration (Business Administration), Computer Information Technology, Business Information Systems, Cybersecurity and Information Assurance, Criminal Justice, Health Care Administration, Marketing, Health Care Administration (Marketing), Psychology, Counseling/Clinical Psychology, Human Performance Psychology, Social Work, and RN-to-BSN
 Certificate: Graduate Certificate in Nursing Education, Health Care Administration Certificate, and Post-Baccalaureate Teacher Residency Licensure Certificate
 Master’s degree: Master of Business Administration (MBA), Master of Health Administration (MHA), and Master of Science in Nursing: Administrative Leadership
 Minors: Accounting, Business Administration, Marketing

Athletics

Methodist University teams participate as a member of the National Collegiate Athletic Association's Division III. The Monarchs are a member of the USA South Athletic Conference (USA South). Men's sports include baseball, basketball, cheer, cross country, football, golf, lacrosse, soccer, tennis and indoor/outdoor track and field. Women's sports include basketball, cheer, cross country, golf, lacrosse, soccer, softball, tennis, indoor/outdoor track and field, and volleyball. Methodist University's teams have won 83 team and individual national championships along with 183 conference championships. To date, Methodist University has also produced 375 NCAA Division III All-Americans and 65 Academic All-Americans.

Golf is one of the most popular sports at Methodist. The women's golf team has won 26 national titles, winning every national title from 1986 to 2012 except 1990 and 1997, when they finished as the national runner-up both years. They later won again in 2021. The men's team also has 13 NCAA Division III national golf championships (1990–1992, 1994–1999, 2010, 2015, 2018, 2022) and were runners-up three times (1984, 1989, 2000).

The school also holds multiple conference championships in other sports. The baseball team is coached by coach Tom Austin, currently sixth overall among all-time NCAA Division III head coaches and fourth among active Division III head coaches in victories. Tom Austin has been the coach of Methodist University's baseball team since 1980 and is one of 64 college baseball coaches ever to reach a thousand career wins. The Monarch baseball team has reached the NCAA National Tournament 22 times and the Division III College World Series six times, finishing fifth or better each time, including national runners-up in 1995.

Notable Awards and Rankings 

 No. 1 Most Diverse College in North Carolina (2022 and 2023)
 Top 16% nationally for social mobility of graduates
 2022 Military Times’ “Best for Vets” College 
 2022-23 Gold Military Friendly School
 2021-22 Military Friendly Spouse School

Notable alumni
 Becky Burleigh, University of Florida women's soccer coach
 Chad Collins, professional golfer 	
 Christopher Daniels, professional wrestler
 Ruth Carter Stapleton, evangelist, Christian psychologist
 Chip Dicks, lawyer and former Virginia delegate
 General John W. Handy, USAF (retired)
 William C. Harrison, superintendent
 TJR, American DJ and music producer
 Wyatt Worthington II, professional golfer

References

External links
 
 Methodist University athletics

 
Private universities and colleges in North Carolina
Education in Fayetteville, North Carolina
Educational institutions established in 1956
Universities and colleges accredited by the Southern Association of Colleges and Schools
Universities and colleges in Cumberland County, North Carolina
Buildings and structures in Fayetteville, North Carolina
1956 establishments in North Carolina